The Exeter Lakeshore Times-Advance is a weekly local newspaper, published in the town of Exeter, Ontario. It serves the counties of Huron, Middlesex, and Lambton. It was established in 1873 as the Exeter Times-Advocate.

The Exeter Times-Advocate was one of several Torstar-owned newspapers purchased by Postmedia in a transaction between the two companies which concluded on November 27, 2017. The paper will continue to be published by Postmedia. In 2018, the Exeter Times Advocate merged with the Grand Bend-based Lakeshore Advance to create the Exeter Lakeshore Times-Advance.

References

Publications established in 1873
1873 establishments in Ontario
Postmedia Network publications
Weekly newspapers published in Ontario